The Fer language, also Dam Fer or Fertit, one of several languages called Kara ("Kara of Birao"), is a Central Sudanic language spoken by some five thousand people in the northern Central African Republic near the Sudanese and Chadian borders, in the region known as Dar Runga.

While the Ethnologue leaves it unclassified, it appears to be a Bongo–Bagirmi language within the Central Sudanic family (Lionel Bender, Pascal Boyeldieu); Roger Blench classifies "Fer" as Bagirmi, but "Kara of Birao" as one of the related Kara languages.

References

External links
 Fer "Kara" - Boyeldieu

Languages of the Central African Republic
Bongo–Bagirmi languages